Dennis Davis is Cabinet Secretary for the West Virginia Department of Veterans Assistance.

Governor Jim Justice appointed Davis to the position at the start of his first term of governor in 2017.

Early life

Dennis Davis is a lifelong resident of Institute, West Virginia. After attending public schools in Kanawha County, Davis attended West Virginia State University and Marshall University earning degrees in industrial arts education, and vocational, technical and adult education.

Military career

In 1959, Davis began his military activity as a member of the West Virginia State University ROTC program. His U.S. Army career included stints at Fort Knox, Kentucky and Fort Sill, Oklahoma. In 1965, he graduated from the Non-Commissioned Officers Academy.

Davis has been a member of the honor guard at the Donel C. Kinnard Memorial State Veterans Cemetery in Institute, since 2012.

Education career

An educator, Davis began his career as a teacher at Dupont Junior High School in 1968. Davis went on to become Job Placement Specialist at the Ben Franklin Career Center, Coordinator of Adult Education at the Garnet Career Center, Coordinator of Cooperative Education and finally Assistant Superintendent of Kanawha County Schools for Vocational, Technical and Adult Education. Davis spent 29 years with the school system.

Davis was elected president of the West Virginia Vocational Association and chairman of the Bylaws Committee for the American Vocational Association.

Previous Political Appointments

In 1996, Governor Cecil Under Underwood appointed Davis as Executive Director of Workforce Development for West Virginia, where he served for 4 years.

In 2013, Davis served briefly as a member of the Kanawha County Board of education, filling a previous member's unexpired term.

Personal life

Davis founded the Davis Property Preservation Company and retired from this work in 2009.
Davis lives in Institute, West Virginia with his wife Margaret. The two have five children.

References

1941 births
Living people
People from Institute, West Virginia
Politicians from Charleston, West Virginia
West Virginia State University alumni
Marshall University alumni
Schoolteachers from West Virginia